Adam Wakeman (born 11 March 1974) is an English musician and the current keyboardist and rhythm guitarist for Ozzy Osbourne's band; he also played keyboards and guitar off-stage for Black Sabbath. Wakeman has also worked with Annie Lennox, Travis, the Company of Snakes, Strawbs, Will Young, Victoria Beckham, Atomic Kitten and Martin Barre.

Wakeman has often collaborated with his father, Rick Wakeman, and has released albums with him. He has also released solo albums Soliloquy, 100 Years Overtime, Real World Trilogy and Neurasthenia. In 2006, he created his own band, Headspace, with Damian Wilson.

Biography 
Wakeman was born into a musical family as the younger brother of Oliver Wakeman and the son of long-term Yes keyboardist Rick Wakeman. He started playing classical piano at the age of eight. He cites Dr. John, Monty Alexander, Jordan Rudess of Dream Theater and Mark Kelly of Marillion as influences, with the solo from Marillion's "Incommunicado" one of the first he learned to play as a child. By the age of seventeen he had obtained grade eight from the ABRSM and had recorded the first album with his father. Father and son toured extensively, the two of them sitting at grand pianos to full scale rock performances with orchestra and choir. At the age of 24, Adam won the Keyboard Magazine Best New Talent award and promptly started a session career of his own in London.

In the mid-1990s, Wakeman formed Jeronimo Road with Fraser Thorneycroft-Smith. An album, Live at the Orange, was released after the band broke up on the Explore Multimedia label. In 2000 and 2001, he toured with his father's old band the Strawbs.

In 2006, he put together the progressive rock band Headspace, with vocalist Damian Wilson, guitarist Pete Rinaldi, bass player Lee Pomeroy and drummer Richard Brook. Their EP entitled I am... was released in 2007 to coincide with support shows at Wembley Arena, Birmingham's NIA and Dublin's The Point with Ozzy Osbourne. They released their debut concept album I Am Anonymous worldwide on 22 May 2012 on the Inside Out / Century Media record label.

He recorded several albums with his father, as Wakeman with Wakeman, as Rick Wakeman and Adam Wakeman and he also participated on three solo albums of Rick. He also participated in Wakeman's tours from 1992, and he appeared in the Border TV's 1996 broadcast and VHS presentation of 'The New Gospels' from the Isle of Mann, the DVD from the Gran Rex, Argentina as well as 2009's Six Wives of Henry VIII at Hampton Court Palace. The 2010 release, Scream, from Ozzy Osbourne featured five songs co-written by Adam Wakeman, although an error in the liner notes means the track "I Want It More" was wrongly credited to only Osbourne and Kevin Churko.

With over 200 pieces of music composed for several production music libraries, Wakeman started www.theperfectmusiclibrary in 2010 representing and creating music for film, television and media. As director of the company, he has placed music across most major TV networks including the BBC, ITV and Sky.

On 2 July 2011, Wakeman started his own radio show on TotalRock radio in London along with fellow members of Headspace, where he (once a month, every first Saturday) playing "the best rock, metal and prog over the last 30 years".

Also in 2011, Wakeman joined with original Whitesnake members Micky Moody and Neil Murray, Laurie Wisefield (Wishbone Ash), Harry James (Thunder, Magnum), and Chris Ousey (Heartland) to form the band Snakecharmer.

In November 2012, Wakeman joined the Strawbs, a band which also previously featured his brother and father, for their tour of that year, he toured with them again in 2015.

In 2020, Adam Wakeman joined Martin Barre for his Latin-American tour.

On 25 February, Wakeman released an album under the moniker Jazz Sabbath, playing songs by Black Sabbath in a jazz style. He is credited as "Milton Keanes".

Discography

Solo 
 1993: Soliloquy
 1994: 100 Years Overtime
 1997: Real World Trilogy
 2003: Neurasthenia
 2021: A Handful of Memories

Wakeman with Wakeman 
 1992: Wakeman With Wakeman – AKA Lure of the Wild
 1993: No Expense Spared
 1994: The Official Bootleg
 1994: Wakeman with Wakeman Live

Rick Wakeman & Adam Wakeman 
 1994: Romance of the Victorian Age
 1996: Vignettes
 1996: Tapestries

Damian Wilson & Adam Wakeman 
Weir Keeper's Tale (2016)
The Sun Will Dance In Its Twilight Hour (2018)
Stripped (2019)

Jazz Sabbath 
Jazz Sabbath (2020, as Milton Keanes)
Jazz Sabbath Vol. 2 (2022, as Milton Keanes)

Collaborations 
 1994: Light Up The Sky – Rick Wakeman
 2001: The Revealing Songs of Yes – Various Artists
 2001: Out of the Blue – Rick Wakeman and the English Rock Ensemble
 2005: Live at the Orange – Jeronimo Road
 2009: The Six Wives of Henry VIII Live at Hampton Court Palace – Rick Wakeman
 2010: Scream – Ozzy Osbourne
 2012: I Am Anonymous – Headspace
 2013: Snakecharmer – Snakecharmer
 2016 : The End - Black Sabbath - keyboards (tracks 5–8)
 2016: All That You Fear Is Gone – Headspace
 2017: The End'' (live) – Black Sabbath

References

External links 
Official website
Official Headspace website
 

1974 births
Living people
English rock keyboardists
Black Sabbath members
English heavy metal keyboardists
English heavy metal guitarists
The Ozzy Osbourne Band members
Strawbs members